Black Kaweah is a mountain of the Kaweah Peaks Ridge of the California's Sierra Nevada, in Sequoia National Park. The peak has a local magnetic disturbance that has caused compasses in the vicinity to vary by up to eight degrees.
Fulgurites can be found on the peak.

References

External links 
 

Mountains of Sequoia National Park
Mountains of Tulare County, California
Mountains of Northern California